Anne Warner may refer to:

Anne Warner (politician) (born 1945), Australian state politician
Anne Warner (rower) (born 1954), American rower
Anne Warner (scientist) (1940–2012), British biologist
Anne Warner (swimmer) (born 1945), American Olympic swimmer
Carol-Ann Warner (born 1945), British Olympic figure skater
Anne Warner (novelist) (1869–1913), American author 
Anne Warner (folklorist) (1905–1991), American folklorist and song collector